Jo Whittemore (born 1977) is an American author of books for children and teens, ranging from fantasy to humorous contemporary.

Bibliography

The Silverskin Legacy
The Silverskin Legacy is a trilogy written by Jo Whittemore and published by Llewellyn Worldwide, about two kids Megan and Ainsley who have lived next door to each other their whole lives, but their relationship is anything but neighborly. The two stumble upon a neighbor who is performing some sort of strange magic, and find themselves transported into a magical new world.

The Silverskin Legacy Series
Escape from Arylon (Llewellyn Publications, March 1, 2006)  
Curse of Arastold (Llewellyn Publications, July 1, 2006)  
Onaj's Horn (Llewellyn Publications, May 1, 2007)

Aladdin M!X titles
Front Page Face-Off (2010)
Odd Girl In (2011)
D is for Drama (2012)
Me & Mom vs. the World [Paperback release of Colonial Madness] (2017)
Published by Simon & Schuster's Aladdin M!X imprint

Aladdin titles
Colonial Madness (2015)

HarperCollins titles
Vanessa's Design Dilemma (2017)

Supergirl
Whittemore has written three YA adaptations of The CW series Supergirl, published by Abrams Books since 2017.

Girls Who Code
Whittemore has written one novel, "Lights, Music, Code," in the Girls Who Code book series, which was banned in the 2021-22 school year by a local school district, according to PEN America.

References

External links
 Aladdin M!X website
 Llewellyn/Flux website
 Author official site

1977 births
Living people
21st-century American novelists
American children's writers
American fantasy writers
American women novelists
Novelists from Kentucky
American women children's writers
Women science fiction and fantasy writers
21st-century American women writers